Lorraine Coghlan Robinson (née Coghlan; born 23 September 1937) is a former tennis player from the state of Victoria in Australia. In 1956, she won the Australian Championships Girls' Singles title. Coghlan teamed with Bob Howe to win the mixed doubles title at Wimbledon in 1958. Coghlan and Howe were also the runners-up in mixed doubles at the 1958 French Championships.

At the Australian Championships, Coghlan was the singles runner-up in 1958, losing to Angela Mortimer 6–3, 6–4, and was a runner-up in women's doubles in 1958, 1959, 1960, and 1967.

Coghlan married John Robinson on 19 December 1959.

Grand Slam finals

Doubles (4 runner-ups)

Mixed doubles (1 title, 1 runner-up)

Grand Slam singles tournament timeline

See also 
 Performance timelines for all female tennis players who reached at least one Grand Slam final

References

External links
 
 

1937 births
Living people
Australian female tennis players
Tennis people from Victoria (Australia)
Grand Slam (tennis) champions in mixed doubles
Grand Slam (tennis) champions in girls' singles
Australian Championships (tennis) junior champions
Wimbledon champions (pre-Open Era)
20th-century Australian women